Thorleif Kockgård (19 February 1899 – 26 August 1982) was a Swedish sports shooter. He competed in the 100 m running deer event at the 1952 Summer Olympics.

References

External links
 

1899 births
1982 deaths
Swedish male sport shooters
Olympic shooters of Sweden
Shooters at the 1952 Summer Olympics
Sportspeople from Västra Götaland County